Hill Hall may refer to:

in England
Hill Hall (Essex) restored Elizabethan mansion near Epping
Headington Hill Hall in Oxford

in the United States
Hill Hall (Savannah State College) in Savannah, Georgia
Hill Hall (Missouri) on the University of Missouri campus in Columbia, Missouri